Frogtown is an unincorporated community in Independence Township, Washington County, Pennsylvania, United States.

References

Unincorporated communities in Washington County, Pennsylvania
Unincorporated communities in Pennsylvania